Cook County is a county in Illinois, United States.

Cook County may also refer to:
Cook County, Georgia, United States
Cook County, Minnesota, United States
Cooke County, Texas, United States
Cook County, New South Wales, Australia
County of Cook, Queensland, Australia
Cook County, New Zealand, one of the former counties of New Zealand on the North Island
Cook County (film)

See also 
 Cook (disambiguation)
 Crook County (disambiguation)